This is a list of notable pastors in Nigeria, both present and past.

Notable pastors

Elijah Abina is the General Overseer of The Gospel Faith Mission International (GOFAMINT)
Enoch Adeboye is a Nigerian pastor and the General Overseer of Redeemed Christian Church of God (RCCG)
Paul Adefarasin, founder and senior pastor, House on the Rock
Godman Akinlabi, founder and senior pastor of The Elevation Church
Matthew Ashimolowo (born 17 March 1952 in Nigeria) is the senior pastor of Kingsway International Christian Centre
Joseph Ayo Babalola (25 April 1904 – 26 July 1959) was the founder of the Christ Apostolic Church
Tunde Bakare pastor of the Latter Rain Assembly. He ran as vice presidential candidate of Muhammadu Buhari in the Nigerian presidential election, 2011
Done P. Dabale, founder of the United Methodist Church in Nigeria (UMCN).
Jerry Eze, Founder Streams of Joy International and convener of New Season Prophetic Prayers and Declaration (NSPPD) - a daily YouTube morning devotional prayer platform on YouTube.
Jeremiah Omoto Fufeyin, founder of Christ Mercyland Deliverance Ministry
David Ibiyeomie, founder and senior pastor of Salvation Ministries
T. B. Joshua (12 June 1963 – 5 June 2021) was the Nigerian pastor and founder of the Synagogue, Church Of All Nations – SCOAN
Yomi Kasali, founder and senior pastor, Foundation of Truth Assembly, Surulere, Lagos State.
William F. Kumuyi (Born 6 June 1941) is a Nigerian pastor, evangelist, General-Overseer and founder of Deeper Christian Life Ministry
Chris Kwakpovwe is founder/senior pastor of Manna Prayer Mountain (MPM) Ministry and author of Our Daily Manna,  a daily devotional
Lazarus Muoka is a Nigerian pastor and the founder of The Lord's Chosen Charismatic Revival Movement.
Timothy Oluwole Obadare (April 1930 – March 2013), founder of the World Soul Winning Evangelistic Ministry.
Bola Odeleke, General Overseer of Power Pentecostal Church
Bimbo Odukoya (12 September 1960 – 11 December 2005) was a Nigerian pastor and televangelist who was the spouse of Taiwo Odukoya, the founder of the Fountain of Life Church.
Taiwo Odukoya, is a Nigerian Pentecostal pastor and public speaker.  He is the senior pastor of The Fountain of Life Church, a Church with a membership of over 8,000 people.
Chris Okotie (born 16 June 1958) is a Nigerian pastor, televangelist and  founder and the General Overseer of the Household of God Church.
Gabriel Olutola (born 4 April 1933 in Ilesa, Osun State) is a Nigerian pastor and president of The Apostolic Church Nigeria 
Emmanuel Omale is a Nigerian charismatic pastor and televangelist. He is the leader and founder of Divine Hand of God Prophetic Ministry.
Lawrence Onochie is a Nigerian pastor and the general overseer of The Kings Heritage Church.
Ayo Oritsejafor is the founding and senior pastor of Word of Life Bible Church and the former president of the Christian Association of Nigeria
Samuel Oshoffa (1909–1985) was the founder of the Celestial Church of Christ C. C .C
Yemi Osinbajo, Vice President of Nigeria (2015–present) former pastor in charge of Lagos Province 48 of the Redeemed Christian Church of God, Banana Island, Ikoyi.
Chris Oyakhilome (known popularly as "Pastor Chris") is a Nigerian pastor, evangelist who is the founding president of Love World also known as Christ Embassy
Bishop David Oyedepo (born 27 September 1954) is a Nigerian pastor, Christian author, preacher, the founder of Winners' Chapel
Johnson Suleman, founder and senior pastor, Omega Fire Ministry, Auchi, Edo State

See also

Christianity in Nigeria

References

Nigerian Christians
Nigerian religious leaders
Pastors
Pastors